The State Highways in Kansas are the state highways owned and maintained by the Kansas Department of Transportation (KDOT) in the U.S. state of Kansas. They are numbered with a K- prefix, e.g. K-10 or K-66.


State highways
By Kansas law, no state highway may exist entirely within city limits. As a result, some highways have been given to cities as they annex the land around them, as is the case with the eastern branch of K-150 in the Kansas City area, which is now entirely within Olathe and Overland Park. This part of K-150 is now known as Santa Fe in Olathe and 135th Street in Overland Park.

See also

References

External links
 Kansas Highway Maps: Current, Historic, KDOT

Highways